Flannel Pajamas is a 2006 American drama film written and directed by Jeff Lipsky. It stars Justin Kirk and Julianne Nicholson. The plot charts the course of a short-lived marriage, from its passionate beginning through the daily erosion of feeling and romance to separation.

Plot

Cast
 Justin Kirk
 Julianne Nicholson
 Rebecca Schull
 Jamie Harrold

Production
Filmed in New York City, NY, Rockland County, NY, and Chester Springs, PA with a budget of just under $500,000,

Release
It was shown at Sundance Film Festival, where it was nominated for a Grand Jury prize. It later opened in several large cities across the country, including New York City, where it received a mixed, though admiring, review from The New York Times, and San Francisco, where it received a similar review from the Chronicle.

Reception
Lipsky, the director, got his start as a distributor of independent films such as John Cassavetes' A Woman Under the Influence, and some reviewers noted Cassavetes' influence on this film. Entertainment Today and the New York Observer both picked it as one of the best films of the year. Roger Ebert called it "one of the wisest films I can remember about love and human intimacy. It is a film of integrity and truth, acted fearlessly, written and directed with quiet, implacable skill."

References

External links

2006 films
2000s English-language films